Boldon railway station served the village of East Boldon, Tyne and Wear, England, from 1844 to 1967 on the Pontop and South Shields Railway.

History 
The station was opened in August 1844 by the Pontop and South Shields Railway. It was situated on the south side of a level crossing on Newcastle Road. Eleven trains ran on weekdays and eight ran on weekends but a limited service began when a new route opened on 1 October 1850. Trains eventually ceased in December 1853 and the station closed to passengers, although it remained open for goods traffic. Its name was changed to West Boldon sometime after. It had a coal and lime depot and two sidings were installed in 1895. Boldon Colliery was to the north. The station closed completely on 7 August 1967.

References 

Disused railway stations in Tyne and Wear
Railway stations in Great Britain opened in 1844
Railway stations in Great Britain closed in 1853
1844 establishments in England
1967 disestablishments in England